Pokemouche 13 is the Statistics Canada census area designation for what is properly termed the Pokemouche Indian Reserve No. 13, located 64 km east of Bathurst, New Brunswick, Canada in Gloucester County near the community of Pokemouche.  The reserve is under the jurisdiction of the Burnt Church First Nation and is 151.4 ha. in size.  Nearby locatlies include Boudreau Road, Cowans Creek, Haut-Sainte-Rose, Landry, and Maltampec.

History

Notable people

See also
List of communities in New Brunswick
List of First Nations in New Brunswick

References

Indian reserves in New Brunswick
Communities in Gloucester County, New Brunswick
Mi'kmaq in Canada